Rowen is located on the railroad  northwest of Keene, at an elevation of .

A post office operated at Rowen from 1906 to 1908.

References

Unincorporated communities in Kern County, California
Unincorporated communities in California